Christian County is a county located in the U.S. state of Illinois. As of the 2010 census, the population was 34,800. Its county seat is Taylorville.

History
Christian County was formed February 15, 1839, out of Sangamon, Montgomery and Shelby counties. It was named for Christian County, Kentucky. It was originally named Dane County and was called Dane County until 1840.

Geography
The county is bounded on the north by Sangamon River, and intersected by the south fork of that stream.

Adjacent counties
 Macon County (northeast)
 Shelby County (southeast)
 Montgomery County (southwest)
 Sangamon County (northwest)

Major highways
  US Route 51
  Illinois Route 16
  Illinois Route 29
  Illinois Route 48
  Illinois Route 104

Climate and weather 

Demographics

As of the 2010 United States Census, there were 34,800 people, 14,055 households, and 9,211 families residing in the county. The racial makeup of the county was 96.6% white, 1.4% black or African American, 0.5% Asian, 0.1% American Indian, 0.4% from other races, and 0.9% from two or more races. Those of Hispanic or Latino origin made up 1.4% of the population. In terms of ancestry, 21.9% were German, 12.7% were Irish, 10.6% were American, and 9.9% were English.

Of the 14,055 households, 30.1% had children under the age of 18 living with them, 50.1% were married couples living together, 10.3% had a female householder with no husband present, 34.5% were non-families, and 29.9% of all households were made up of individuals. The average household size was 2.36 and the average family size was 2.90. The median age was 41.6 years.

The median income for a household in the county was $41,712 and the median income for a family was $52,680. Males had a median income of $42,897 versus $30,027 for females. The per capita income for the county was $21,519. About 12.7% of families and 16.6% of the population were below the poverty line, including 28.6% of those under age 18 and 9.4% of those age 65 or over.

Communities

Cities
 Assumption
 Pana
 Taylorville

Villages

 Bulpitt
 Edinburg
 Harvel
 Jeisyville
 Kincaid
 Morrisonville
 Mount Auburn
 Moweaqua
 Owaneco
 Palmer
 Stonington
 Tovey

Census-designated places
 Langleyville

Other unincorporated places

 Bolivia
 Clarksdale
 Dunkel
 Ellis
 Grove City
 Hewittsville
 Midway
 Millersville
 Old Stonington
 Osbernville
 Radford
 Roby
 Rosamond
 Sharpsburg
 Sicily
 Vanderville
 Velma
 Willey Station
 Zenobia

Townships
Christian County is divided into these seventeen townships:

 Assumption
 Bear Creek
 Buckhart
 Greenwood
 Johnson
 King
 Locust
 May
 Mosquito
 Mount Auburn
 Pana
 Prairieton
 Ricks
 Rosamond
 South Fork
 Stonington
 Taylorville

Notable people
 Jon Corzine, Former governor of New Jersey, former resident of Willey Station.
 Roy A. Corzine (1882-1957), Illinois state representative and farmer, was born in Stonington.
 Harry Forrester, member of the Illinois Basketball Hall of Fame and Quincy University Hall of Fame.
 Brant Hansen, Christian radio host and author, graduated from high school in Assumption.
 Frank P. Sadler (1872–1931), Illinois state senator and lawyer, lived on a farm near Grove City.
 John Wesley Fribley (1906–2002), state senate (1934–1952), born in Pana

Politics
Like most of German-settled Central Illinois, Christian County was solidly Democratic until Woodrow Wilson’s response to German defeat in World War I turned the county over to the Republican Party in its 1920, 1924 and 1928 landslides. The county remained Democratic-leaning through the rest of the twentieth century, only voting Republican in landslide wins. However, since 2000 Christian County has become reliably Republican.

See also
 National Register of Historic Places listings in Christian County, Illinois
List of counties in Illinois

References
Specific

General
 United States Census Bureau 2007 TIGER/Line Shapefiles
 United States Board on Geographic Names (GNIS)
 United States National Atlas

 
1839 establishments in Illinois
Illinois counties
Populated places established in 1839